The Markiezaatskade is a  long dam between Zuid-Beveland and the Molenplaat near Bergen op Zoom. The dam was built in preparation for the construction of the Oesterdam, which was built a few years later. In combination with the Oesterdam, Philipsdam and Volkerakdam it divides the waters of Zeeland and South Holland.

Construction of the Markiezaatskade commenced in 1980. In March 1982 a part of the dam was destroyed by a storm. Construction on the dam was completed by March 30, 1983.

References

Further reading
 
 

Delta Works
Dams completed in 1983
Dams in Zeeland
Zuid-Beveland
Buildings and structures in Reimerswaal
Transport in Reimerswaal